Giovanni Battista Natali (Pontremoli, 1698 – Piacenza, 1768) was an Italian painter of the late-Baroque period, active in his natal city of Piacenza, but also Savona, Lucca, and Naples, and finally Genoa in 1736.

Filippo de'Boni lists four artists with this same name, who are perhaps different from the above. 
GB Natali (Bologna, c 1630 – Cremona, c. 1700), son of Carlo Natali (il Guardolino), and pupil of Pietro da Cortona in Rome, returned to work in Cremona. Giovanni Battista was father of Giuseppe Natali (1652–1725).
GB Natali, son of Francesco Natali (c. 1654) of Casalmaggiore was a painter for King Charles of Sicily and his successor.
GB Natali was an engraver in woodcuts, disciple of Ludovico Carracci.
GB Natali, son of Giuseppe Natali, the brother of Francesco and cousin of GB above, painted for the court of Saxony.

References

18th-century Italian painters
Italian male painters
Italian Baroque painters
Year of death unknown
Year of birth unknown
People from Piacenza
1698 births
18th-century Italian male artists